BabyRiki is a Russian CGI children's animated television series that is a pre-school version of Kikoriki.

Characters 

 Krashy - a kid version of Krash.
 Wally - a kid version of Wally.
 Rosy - a kid version of Rosa.
 ChiChi - a kid version of Chiko.
 Pandy - a kid version of Pandy.

Release 
The series aired on Movile's PlayKids and Splash's Kabillion in United States, and on ITVBe's LittleBe in the United Kingdom.

References 

Russian children's television series